Snake Mountain may refer to:

Places
 Snake Mountain (North Carolina), USA
 Snake Mountain (Vermont), USA
 Snake Mountains of Nevada, USA

Other uses
 The fictional headquarters of Skeletor in the Masters of the Universe cartoon series